Drasteria yerburyi is a moth of the family Erebidae. It is found in Somalia, Eritrea, the United Arab Emirates, Yemen and Iran.

The larvae feed on Taverniera spartea.

References

Drasteria
Moths described in 1892
Moths of Africa
Moths of Asia